Nilakal Diocese is one of the 30 dioceses of the Malankara Orthodox Syrian Church. The diocese was created on 15 August 2010. Now, H.G. Dr.Joshua Mar Nichodemos is the Metropoliton of the diocese. The head office is located in Nilackal Orthodox diocesan Centre, St.Thomas Aramana, Pazhavangadi, Ranni, Pathanamthitta

History

Nilakal Diocese was created on 15 August 2010. It was under by the order of Baselios Marthoma Didymos I, the Catholicos of the East and Malankara Metropolitan. H.G. Joshua Mar Nichodemos is the first Metropoliton of this diocese. The diocese was formed with 39 parishes. The name of diocese came from the place Christian community in the place Nilackal, founded by Saint Thomas in first century AD.

Now

Now, H.G. Joshua Mar Nichodemos is the Metropoliton of the diocese. The head office is located in Nilackal Orthodox diocesan Centre, St.Thomas Aramana, Pazhavangadi, Ranni, Pathanamthitta. The diocese comprises the parts of Pathanamthitta and Kottayam districts. The diocese consists 39 Parishes with 13 to 200 families. There are 2953 families in diocese. The diocese purchased a building in Ranni and made it the headquarters. The diocese made various charitable activities like supporting the poor and the needy of the diocese as well as the society.

Ecclesiastical districts

The diocese consists five ecclesiastical districts.
Ayroor
Vayalathala
Ranni
Nilackal
Kanakappalam

Spiritual Organisations

There are many spiritual organisations working actively in this diocese, these are some of them. 

OSSAE
OCYM
MOMS
MGOCSM
Ecology Commission
Sushrushaka Sangam
Lehari Virudha Sangam
Dasamsadayaka Sangam
INAMS

Projects under consideration

Construction of a Convention Centre at Catholicate Centre Ranni, Completion of the Catholicate Centre at Angamoozhi, beginning of St.Gregorios Mission Centre at Vellayil, Ayroor and starting of an  Education Institution are some of the major projects under consideration.

Parishes

1) Angamoozhi St.George Orthodox Church

2) Ayroor Kurishumutom St.Stephens Orthodox Church

3) Ayroor Thadeethra Mar Behanan Orthodox Church

4) Ayroor Salem St.Johns Orthodox Church

5) Ayroor St.Marys Orthodox Cheriyapali

6) Ayroor South Mar Behanan Orthodox pazayapali

7) Ayroor Madhaphara St.Thomas Orthodox Valiyapali

8) Chempanmukhom St.Johns Orthodox Church

9) Chethomkara Salem St.Thomas Orthodox Church

10) Chittar St.George Orthodox Valiyapali

11) Edappavoor Mar Gregorios Orthodox Church

12) Karikulam St.Marys Orthodox Church

13) Karimbinamkuzhy Salem St.Marys Orthodox Church

14) Kattoor St.Marys Orthodox Valiyapali

15) Kanakapalam St.George Orthodox Valiyapali

16) Kanakapalam St.George Catholicate Center

17) Kurumbanmuzhi St.Gregorios Orthodox Church

18) Keekozhoor St.peters and St.pauls Orthodox Church

19) Kottanadu St.George Orthodox Church

20) Kuttiyani St.George Orthodox Church

21) Mukkalumon St.George Orthodox Church

22) Nilackal St.Thomas Orthodox Church

23) Naranamoozhy St.George Orthodox Church

24) Padimon St.Gregorios Orthodox Church

25) Perumpetty St.Marys Orthodox Church

26) Perunad Bethany St.Thomas Orthodox Church

27) Poovanmala St.George Orthodox Church

28) Punchavayal St.Marys Orthodox Church

29) Ranni St.Gregorios Orthodox Church

30) Seethathodu Mar Gregorios Orthodox Church

31) Thalayanathodam St.Marys Orthodox Church

33) Thirumuttom St.Marys Orthodox Church

34) Thotammon St.Thomas Orthodox Cathedral

35) Thonikadavu Mar Gregorios Orthodox Church

36) Vadaserikara Marthamariam Orthodox Theerthadana Pali

37) Vayalathala Mar Cleemis Bethseen Orthodox Church

38) Vayalathala St.Marys Orthodox Church

39) Vayalathala Mar Severios Seleeba Orthodox Valiyapali

40) Vechoochira Mar Gregorios Orthodox Church

41) Vayyattupuzha St.Thomas Orthodox Church

References

External links
Website of Malankara Orthodox Church

Malankara Orthodox Syrian Church dioceses
2010 establishments in Kerala